Seven Songs, Op. 17, is a collection of Swedish and Finnish songs by Finnish composer Jean Sibelius for solo voice and piano.  The music was written between 1891 and 1904:

No. 1 Se'n har jag ej frågat mera (Since then I have enquired no further) (J.L. Runeberg). Finished 1891-92; Arranged as a song with orchestra in 1903. 
No. 2 Sov in! (Go to Sleep!) (Karl August Tavaststjerna). Finished 1891−92.
No. 3 Fågellek (Enticement) (Karl August Tavaststjerna). Finished 1891.
No. 4 Vilse (Astray) (Karl August Tavaststjerna). First version finished in 1898, final version in 1902.
No. 5 En slända (Dragonfly) (Oscar Levertin). Finished in 1904.
No. 6 Illalle (To Evening) (A. V. Koskimies). Finished in 1898. The poem was written for Koskimies' fiancée and wife, Ilta Bergroth, whose name, Ilta, means 'evening'. 
No. 7 Lastu lainehilla (Driftwood) (Ilmari Calamnius, Finnish surname Kianto). Finished in 1902. Sibelius also set the song in German, 'Der Span auf den Wellen' (translated by Alfred Julius Boruttau (1877-1940)).

References

External links 
 
 Dates, etc. from A List of Sibelius' works, in order by opus number, on the Jean Sibelius website created by The Finnish Club of Helsinki (in English).
 Good background information in Songs and From Late Romanticism to a stylistic transition at the Jean Sibelius website created by The Finnish Club of Helsinki (in English).

Lyrics 

 Lyrics below are from The LiederNet Archive
 No.1  in Swedish and English.
 No.2  in Swedish and Finnish. 
 No.3  in Swedish. 
 No.4  in Swedish and Finnish.
 No.6  in Finnish and English.
 No.7  in Finnish and German, 'Der Span auf den Wellen' (trans. by Alfred Julius Boruttau (1877-1940).

Compositions by Jean Sibelius
Classical song cycles in Finnish
Art songs